César Espinoza can refer to:

 César Espinoza (Chilean footballer)
 César Espinoza (Venezuelan footballer)